Brynna is a small village situated between Pencoed and Llanharan. It is located at the point where the borders of two Welsh county boroughs, Rhondda Cynon Taf and Bridgend, meet.

Due to Brynna's proximity to the M4 motorway as well as both Pencoed and Llanharan railway stations, it offers residents easy access to most of South Wales.

Brynna was originally called Brynna Gwynion but church records show that it was later shortened to Brynna from 1897 onwards.

Education 
Brynna is home to one primary school, Brynnau Primary School and is a feeder school for nearby Pencoed Comprehensive School. Welsh language provision is catered by Ysgol Gynradd Dolau in nearby Llanharan.

Opening in 1904 Brynnau Primary School celebrated its centenary year in 2004 with a number of events taking part in the village.

Governance
Brynna was also the name of an electoral ward to Rhondda Cynon Taf County Borough Council. It formed the western half of the Llanharan community (bordered to the west by Bridgend County Borough) and included Brynna village, Bryncae and Llanilid. The ward elected a county councillor.

Following a ward boundary review, Brynna merged with the Llanharan ward to form a new ward named 'Brynna and Llanharan' effective from the May 2022 local elections. The new ward elects three county borough councillors.

Brynna is also a community ward for Llanharan Community Council, electing six of the fourteen community councillors.

Social life 
Social life in Brynna focuses around The Mountain Hare and Whitehills pubs. A previous pub the Eagle Inn is now closed. Brynna FC is the local football (soccer) team and it currently plays in the South Wales Bridgend premier division.

Amenities
Brynna Woods and Llanharan Marsh have recently (2010) been taken over by the Wildlife Trust of South and West Wales and work is in progress to improve access for local people to enjoy this outstanding area for wildlife.

2013 will see major work by the Wildlife Trust to improve the habitat of Llanharan Marsh which is one of the few types of 'Valley Mire' habitats in Rhondda Cynon Taff. Fencing and subsequent grazing by local Welsh black cattle will help to bring back some of the natural flora and fauna that were previously there.

References

External links 
www.geograph.co.uk : photos of Brynna and surrounding area
www.mountainhare.co.uk : Website of the Mountain Hare Inn, Brynnau Gwynion
www.2426.org.uk : Website of the Local Air Cadet Unit

Villages in Rhondda Cynon Taf
Wards of Rhondda Cynon Taf